Thomas Gunning Kelley (born May 13, 1939) is a retired captain in the United States Navy who received the Medal of Honor for his actions during the Vietnam War. From 2003 to 2011 he served as Secretary of the Massachusetts Department of Veterans' Services. He served as the president of the Medal of Honor Society from 2015 to 2017.

Early life
Kelley was born on May 13, 1939 in Boston, Massachusetts, to John Basil Kelley, a school teacher and principal, and Elizabeth Gunning. Brought up in a Roman Catholic family, Kelley is a graduate of two Jesuit schools: Boston College High School, class of 1956; and the College of the Holy Cross, class of 1960.

Military career
In June 1960, Kelley joined the United States Navy through the Officer Candidate School program in Newport, Rhode Island.

On June 15, 1969, Kelley led eight river assault craft boats on a mission to extract a United States Army infantry company from the bank of the Ong Muong Canal in Kien Hoa Province, South Vietnam. When a boat malfunctioned, he ordered the other craft to circle the disabled boat that had come under attack and placed his boat directly in the line of enemy fire. A rocket-propelled grenade struck nearby, severely injuring Kelley, but he continued to protect his men until they could get to safety, then ordered medical assistance for himself. For this feat he was awarded the Medal of Honor.

Despite the loss of one eye during this action and the Navy's decision that he was no longer fit for service, Kelley persevered in his requests to remain on active duty. In addition, he earned his master's degree in management at the Naval Postgraduate School in Monterey, California. Later he completed the Armed Forces Staff College course in Norfolk, Virginia, and served in the Office of the Chief of Naval Operations in manpower and planning. In 1982, Kelley was assigned to Yokohama as the commander of the navy's Military Sealift Command Far East for oversight of its ships' repairs and maintenance. His following assignment was as chief of staff for the commander of United States Naval Forces in Korea. Kelley's final assignment was as the director of legislation in the Bureau of Naval Personnel. There he worked closely with Vice Admiral Mike Boorda to increase the responsibilities and stature of enlisted personnel, while closely integrating minorities and women into mainstream assignments. He retired in 1990 after 30 years of service. His military awards include: Medal of Honor, Legion of Merit (three awards), and Purple Heart.

Later and current life
After his navy service, Kelley worked as a civilian in the Department of Defense for several years before returning to Boston. He became commissioner of the Massachusetts Department of Veterans' Services in April 1999 and was named Secretary of that department in August 2003. While Secretary, Kelley ran the Commonwealth's veterans' public assistance program, along with educational benefits and annuities for the disabled. After 9/11, as veterans began returning to Massachusetts, Kelley created programs to serve their unique needs, especially those involving the unseen wounds of war, such as traumatic brain injury and suicide prevention. He hired young, disabled veterans to reach out to this new cadre. He also worked with the United States Department of Labor to enforce federal employment protections for returning service men and women.

In January 2011, Kelley retired from public service. His more than 40 years of naval and state service were recognized in a tribute attended by 500 people that also raised $300,000 for the Massachusetts Soldiers' Legacy Fund, which pays the educational expenses for children of those soldiers who died in the Global War on Terror.

From 2015 to 2017, Kelley served as president of the Medal of Honor Society. He advocated for the living recipients and their spouses and promoted their Character Development Program in middle, high, and now elementary schools. The program draws on examples of courage, commitment, sacrifice and integrity from the recipients' lives. Kelley also provides meals for a homeless shelter and helps run the veterans' ministry at his church. He remains close to Holy Cross and serves on its O'Callahan Society that supports their NROTC program. He mentors students at BC High, is an active alumnus, and received their Ignatius Award in 2015.  He has served on the Army's Arlington National Cemetery Advisory Committee since 2012.  He is on the board of the Homebase Program, a collaboration of the Boston Red Sox Foundation and Massachusetts General Hospital that helps veterans and their families recover from the invisible wounds of war. He was recognized for a Lifetime Achievement Award in 2019 and serves on the board of directors of the USS Constitution Museum.

Honors and author
Kelley received an honorary doctoral degree from the Massachusetts School of Professional Psychology, now the William James College, in 2009 and an honorary Doctor of Laws from Boston University in 2012.

Kelly is a member of the Ancient and Honorable Artillery Company of Massachusetts.

Kelley and his wife Joan, published a military memoir, The Siren's Call and Second Chances, about perseverance, service, courage and love. The book's proceeds go to the Ahern Family Charitable Foundation, which supports returning veterans and their families.

In January 2023, Secretary of the Navy Carlos Del Toro announced that the future  guided missile destroyer  (DDG-140) will be named in his honor.

Personal life
Kelley has three daughters, Liza DuVal, Kate Clark and Jane Kelley. Kelley married the former Joan O'Connor in October 2005. She retired from the Naval Reserve as a commander after 20 years as a public affairs officer.  She has a son, Brian O'Connor.

Medal of Honor citation
Kelley's official Medal of Honor citation reads:

See also

 List of Medal of Honor recipients for the Vietnam War

References

External links
 Interview at the Pritzker Military Museum & Library

1939 births
Living people
People from Boston
Boston College High School alumni
College of the Holy Cross alumni
United States Navy Medal of Honor recipients
United States Navy captains
Massachusetts Secretaries of Veterans' Services
United States Navy personnel of the Vietnam War
Vietnam War recipients of the Medal of Honor
Riverine warfare
Recipients of the Legion of Merit
Military personnel from Massachusetts